
Lackawanna (from a Lenni Lenape word meaning "stream that forks") is the name of various places and later businesses in the mid-Atlantic United States, generally tracing their name in some manner from the Lackawanna River in Pennsylvania.

Places

Inhabited places
Lackawanna, New York, a city in Erie County, New York, just south of Buffalo
Lackawanna County, Pennsylvania, a county in northeast Pennsylvania, of which the county seat is Scranton

Natural formations
Lackawanna River, a tributary of the Susquehanna River in northeastern Pennsylvania 
Lake Lackawanna, Sussex County, NJ, a man-made lake (circa 1911) and golf course

Other places
Lackawanna Coal Mine, a former mine redeveloped as a museum in Scranton, Pennsylvania
Lackawanna College, a college in Scranton, Pennsylvania
Lackawanna State Park, in northeastern Pennsylvania
Lackawanna State Forest, former name of Pinchot State Forest

Railroads
Delaware-Lackawanna Railroad, an extant shortline railroad operating in Northeastern Pennsylvania
Erie Lackawanna Railroad (1960–1968)
Delaware, Lackawanna and Western Railroad (1853–1960), also known as the Lackawanna Railroad
Lackawanna and Bloomsburg Railroad (1852–1873), 19th century railroad that ran between Scranton and Northumberland
Lackawanna and Western Railroad (1853–1960)
Lackawanna and Wyoming Valley Railroad (1903–1976), third rail electric interurban streetcar line from 1903 to 1976

Arts 
The Lackawanna Valley, a circa 1855 painting by George Inness
Lackawanna Blues, a 2001 Ruben Santiago-Hudson play that was adapted as a 2005 television movie

Other uses
, two ships in the U.S. navy
Lackawanna (Front Royal, Virginia), a historic home in Front Royal, Warren County, Virginia
Lackawanna Steel Company, a former steel company that started in Scranton then moved to western New York

See also
Buffalo Six or the Lackawanna Six, American citizens accused of aiding terrorism
Lackawanna Cut-Off
Lackawanna Cut-Off Restoration Project
Lackawanna Old Road
Lackawanna Terminal (disambiguation)